Telephlebia godeffroyi is a species of dragonfly in the family Telephlebiidae,
known as the eastern evening darner. 
It is a medium to large, dark chestnut brown dragonfly with dark markings on the leading edge of its wings.
It is endemic to eastern New South Wales, Australia, where it inhabits stream margins and waterfalls,
and flies at dusk.

Gallery

See also
 List of Odonata species of Australia

References

Telephlebiidae
Odonata of Australia
Endemic fauna of Australia
Taxa named by Edmond de Sélys Longchamps
Insects described in 1883